The 1903 Carlisle Indians football team represented the Carlisle Indian Industrial School as an independent during the 1903 college football season. Led by fifth-year head coach Pop Warner, the Indians compiled a record of 11–2–1 and outscored opponents 274 to 62.

In 1903, an Indian team coached by Warner first employed its infamous "hidden-ball play" against heavily favored Harvard. Warner, as coach at Cornell, had already used it against Penn State in 1897, but it had not achieved much notice. Carlisle led Harvard at halftime, and hoping to keep the game's momentum, Warner elected to try the play on the ensuing kickoff. Harvard executed the kick, and the Indians formed a circle around the returner. With the aid of a specially altered jersey, the ball was placed up the back of the returner. The Indians broke the huddle and spread out in different directions. Each player feigned carrying the ball, except Dillon, the man with the ball up the back of his jersey. The ruse confused the Crimson players, and they scrambled to find the ball carrier. Dillon, with both his hands free, was ignored by the searching Harvard players, and he ran untouched into the end zone. With the score, Carlisle extended its lead to 11–0, but Harvard came back and eventually won 12–11. Nevertheless, the close match, and trick play, resulted in national attention. Warner had learned the trick from John Heisman while facing Auburn in 1895 during his tenure as coach of the Georgia Bulldogs.

Quarterback and captain Jimmy Johnson was selected All-American by Walter Camp. "Camp based his selection on a remarkable game he witnessed when Carlisle played Harvard. Johnson was small but fiery, and was a leader."

Schedule

See also
 1903 College Football All-America Team

References

Carlisle
Carlisle Indians football seasons
Carlisle Indians football